This is a list of films produced by the Tollywood film industry based in Madras in the 1950s:

1950s
Telugu
Telugu films